The Electricity sector in Imperial Russia developed in the late nineteenth century. Vladimir Chikolev founded the electrical engineering section of the Imperial Russian Technical Society in 1878.

References

Electric power in Russia
Economy of the Russian Empire